The 1926–27 Cornell Big Red men's ice hockey season was the 22nd season of play for the program. The teams was coached by Nick Bawlf in his 7th season.

Season
There was both good and bad news for the team to begin the season. Beebe Lake froze early, enabling coach Bawlf to form the team at the beginning of December, but only two regulars were returning. To make matters worse, Benjamin Tilton, who had collected 70% of Cornell goals, had graduated and the new lineup would have to work hard to replace his production. On a positive note, Bubier, who was ineligible for the teal last season, returned to the squad for his senior year. He ended up scoring the team's first goal of the season in what was otherwise an uninspired performance.

The lineup was shuffled ahead of the second game and the team responded with a much better performance. The Big Red earned their second shutout against Syracuse in as many games. After a two-goal performance, Bubier was looking like an apt replacement for Tilton. In the team's game against Princeton he opened the scoring and when the teams ended the first period with a 1–1 tie there was hope that the Big Red might be able to win the match. The Tigers, however, had other ideas and scored eight consecutive goals to end the match with a convincing victory.

Once the team reformed after the exam break, there were several changed in the lineup. Burnett was brought in to start at right wing while O'Neill made an appearance on defense. Despite the changes, the team worked well together due in part to strenuous practices and they ended regulation with a 1–1 tie. In the second overtime, Barthen scored the go-ahead goal but Williams roared back with three unanswered before time ran out. Cornell wasn't expected to compete with Dartmouth, however, keeping the high-powered Indians to 5 goals was a decent result. Senior netminder Nash was singled out for his play and the team stayed in the game despite using just one substitute for the entire match.

continued shuffling of the lineup didn't work for the next game and Cornell dropped its first ever meeting with St. Lawrence. While the game was close, the Big Red's offense just could not get on track against the Saints. The team's offense remained dormant in their final game, scoring a single goal in another close loss. Cornell would not play as many as seven games in a season again until 1940.

Roster

Standings

Schedule and Results

|-
!colspan=12 style=";" | Regular Season

Scoring Statistics

Note: Assists were not recorded as a statistic.

References

Cornell Big Red men's ice hockey seasons
Cornell
Cornell
Cornell
Cornell